Staten Island Chuck, also referred to more formally as Charles G. Hogg, is a groundhog who resided in the Staten Island Zoo in Staten Island, New York City. He serves as the official groundhog meteorologist of New York City, who predicts the duration of winter each February 2 on Groundhog Day. The tradition dates back to 1981. He makes the prediction based on whether or not he sees his shadow during the ceremony between 7:00 A.M. and 7:30 A.M. on Groundhog Day. The ceremony at the zoo is sometimes attended and officiated by the Mayor of New York City. Chuck's prediction for 2023 was early spring; opposite the prediction made by Punxsutawney Phil.

Notable moments
Staten Island Chuck bit New York City Mayor Michael Bloomberg in 2009. In 2013, the mayor did not attend the ceremony for the fifth time during his 12 years in office. No reason for his absence was provided.

Because of the Bloomberg incident, Chuck was secretly replaced by his granddaughter, Charlotte, for the first Groundhog Day ceremony held during the mayoralty of Bill de Blasio. During that ceremony (held February 2, 2014), de Blasio dropped Charlotte onto the ground in front of "shocked schoolchildren". Charlotte died February 9, 2014, although the Staten Island Zoo did not make this fact public until several months later. According to the New York Post, a necropsy attributed Charlotte's death to "acute internal injuries" consistent with a fall. Despite the Post'''s accusation of a coverup and reports that De Blasio had killed the groundhog, the zoo initially claimed that the animal died of natural causes, and later took the position that it was "unlikely" that Charlotte's death was caused by the fall.

Chuck's daughter, Charlotte Jr., served as a stand-in for him at Groundhog Day 2015.  On February 2, 2015, this female "Staten Island Chuck" walked out of a hutch that an elevator had lifted onto the stage of a portable Plexiglas habitat, while de Blasio watched from six feet (1.8 m) away. De Blasio did not attend the 2016 ceremonies, as he was in Iowa campaigning for Hillary Clinton's Presidential bid; Lieutenant Governor of New York Kathy Hochul officiated the groundhog ceremony in de Blasio's stead. He likewise did not attend the ceremony in 2017, 2018, or 2019. In 2020, Mayor de Blasio confirmed that he has no plans to ever return to the Groundhog Day Ceremony at the Staten Island Zoo: "I tried it, it didn't end well, I won't be back," de Blasio said.

In 2017, Staten Island Chuck made his publication debut in the children's book Groundhog Chuck Builds a Weather Station''. Authored by known animal lover and supporter of the outdoors, Staten Island's Deputy Borough President Ed Burke, the book follows Chuck and his zoo friends on an adventure to ensure the right weather forecast is always made.

Past predictions
The Staten Island Zoo has claimed that Chuck correctly predicted the duration of winter 26 out of 32 years as of 2013, an 82% success rate.

See also
Balzac Billy
Buckeye Chuck
Fred la marmotte
General Beauregard Lee
Punxsutawney Phil
Shubenacadie Sam
Stormy Marmot
Wiarton Willie

References

External links
The Staten Island Zoo where Chuck resides
Video of Staten Island Chuck biting Mayor Michael Bloomberg
 Bite Lands Staten Island Chuck's Mug on Shirt

Individual groundhogs
Staten Island
Holiday characters
Oracular animals
Individual animals in the United States
Groundhog Day
Recurring events established in 1981